The 1995 Recopa Sudamericana was the seventh Recopa Sudamericana, an annual football match between the winners of the previous season's Copa Libertadores and Supercopa Sudamericana competitions. The all-Argentinian final took place in the neutral venue of the National Olympic Stadium of Tokyo.

The match was contested by Vélez Sársfield, winners of the 1994 Copa Libertadores, and Independiente, winners of the 1994 Supercopa Sudamericana, on April 9, 1995. Independiente surprisingly defeated Carlos Bianchi's Vélez Sársfield 0-1 to lift the trophy for the first time. Paraguayan Juan Escobar Valdez became the first referee to direct two consecutive finals and three, in total, of the competition.

Qualified teams

Match details

References

Rec
Recopa Sudamericana
Recopa Sudamericana
Recopa Sudamericana 1995
Recopa Sudamericana 1995
1995